A species of special concern (SSC or CSC) is a protective legal designation assigned by the California Department of Fish and Wildlife (CDFW) to wildlife species that are at risk. 

An SSC is a species, subspecies, or distinct population of an animal native to California that currently satisfies one or more of the following (not necessarily mutually exclusive) criteria: 

 it is extirpated from the state or, in the case of birds, in its primary seasonal or breeding role; 
 it is listed as threatened or endangered under the Federal Endangered Species Act (ESA) but not under the state ESA; 
 it meets the state ESA definition of threatened or endangered but has not formally been listed under the state ESA; 
 it is experiencing, or formerly experienced, serious (noncyclical) population declines or range retractions (that have not been reversed) that, if continued or resumed, could qualify it for threatened or endangered status under the state ESA; 
 it has naturally small populations exhibiting high susceptibility to risk from any factor(s), that if realized, could lead to declines that would qualify it for threatened or endangered status under the state ESA.

Definitions from the California Department of Fish and Wildlife

"Species of Special Concern" status applies to animals not listed under the federal Endangered Species Act or the California Endangered Species Act, but which nonetheless (1) are declining at a rate that could result in listing, or (2) historically occurred in low numbers and known threats to their persistence currently exist. SSC share one or more of the following criteria:

These are species that are not endangered or threatened, but their population number is in special concern of wildlife foundations.

 Occur in small, isolated populations or in fragmented habitat, and are threatened by further isolation and population reduction;
 Show marked population declines. Population estimates are unavailable for the vast majority of taxa. Species that show a marked population decline, yet are still abundant, do not meet the Special Concern definition, whereas marked population decline in uncommon or rare species is an inclusion criterion;
 Depend on a habitat that has shown substantial historical or recent declines in size. This criterion infers the population viability of a species based on trends in the habitats upon which it specializes. Coastal wetlands, particularly in the urbanized San Francisco Bay and south-coastal areas, alluvial fan sage scrub and coastal sage scrub in the southern coastal basins, and arid scrub in the San Joaquin Valley, are examples of California habitats that have seen dramatic reductions in size in recent history. Species that specialize in these habitats generally meet the criteria for Threatened or Endangered status or Special Concern status;
 Occur only in or adjacent to an area where habitat is being converted to land uses incompatible with the animal's survival;
 Have few California records, or which historically occurred here but for which there are no recent records; and
 Occur largely on public lands, but where current management practices are inconsistent with the animal's persistence.

This designation is intended to result in special consideration for these animals by the Department, land managers, consulting biologists, and others, and is intended to focus attention on the species to help avert the need for costly listing under federal and State endangered species laws and cumbersome recovery efforts that might ultimately be required. This designation also is intended to stimulate collection of additional information on the biology, distribution, and status of poorly known at-risk species, and focus research and management attention on them.

Department staff should consider SSCs during (1) the environmental review process, (2) conservation planning process, (3) the preparation of management plans for Department lands, and (4) inventories, surveys, and monitoring (conducted either by the Department or others with whom we are cooperating).

The Habitat Conservation Planning Branch (HCPB) is responsible for producing and periodically updating SSC publications that provide the following information: description of the animal, taxonomic remarks, distribution (text description), life history, habitat, status, management recommendations, and a range and/or distribution map. Publications currently exist based on the following taxonomic groups: mammals (1986, new version due 2001), birds (1978, new version due 2001), amphibians and reptiles (1994), and fishes (1995). These publications are updated periodically as staff and funding allow. Publications are typically produced by a contractor knowledgeable about the species groups. The contractor's draft publication is reviewed by Department regional and headquarters staff, as well as by the contractor's peers, other agencies, and other biologists, as appropriate. Final publication of an SSC document requires approval of the Director.

The HCPB staff is available to assist with questions, provide expertise and/or names of species experts, coordinate funding requests, and answer policy questions related to SSCs.

References 

Endangered species
Environment of California
Nature conservation in the United States